Saxon is an unincorporated census-designated place located in the town of Saxon, Iron County, Wisconsin, United States. Saxon has a post office with ZIP code 54559. As of the 2010 census, its population is 90.

History
A post office called Saxon has been in operation since 1887. The community was named after the Saxons, the ancient German people. Joseph J. Defer (1866-1929) served as postmaster of Saxon from 1904 to 1914 and as sheriff of Iron County. He owned a general store and sawmill. Defer served in the Wisconsin Assembly in 1919 and 1920.

References

Census-designated places in Iron County, Wisconsin
Census-designated places in Wisconsin